is one of the two towns in Toyono District. The town is located in the second northernmost area in Osaka Prefecture, Japan. The town is surrounded by two municipal borders to Kyoto Prefecture and Kawanishi, Hyōgo. The town covers the hilly and forest area in northern Osaka Prefecture. The West Block is at 200 to 300 meters high altitude, and the East and Southeast Blocks are at 400 to 600 meters high.

As of October 2016, the town has an estimated population of 19,519 and a density of 570 persons per km2. The total area is 34.37 km2.

The West Block has a few convenient access to the nearby city area within a 10-minute car drive. The Super highway provides an exit called "Minoh Todoromi" and the electrical railways provide 3 stations in the West Block. The railway runs to the northwest and to the south. It takes less than 1 hour to Osaka Umeda Station.

Transportation
Railways
Nose Railway
Myoken Line
 - Kofudai Station　(Osaka) - Tokiwadai Station (Osaka) - Myōkenguchi Station

Buses
Hankyu Bus

Highway
National Routes

Blocks (City Block's Postal Zip Code)

West Block 

 Yoshikawa 563-0101
 Tokiwadai 563-0102
 Higashi-Tokiwadai 563-0103
 Kofudai 563-0104
 Shinkofudai 563-0105
 Honotani 563-0100

East Block 

 Yono 563-0219
 Nomaguchi 563-0218
 Maki 563-0211
 Kirihata 563-0213
 Terada 563-0212
 Kawashiri 563-0217
 Kishiro 563-0215
 Kibogaoka 563-0214

Southeast Block 

 Takayama 563-0216

History 
Toyono is the origin of a cultivar of Japanese chestnut called Ginyose that is resistant to the chestnut gall wasp - it is believed to have derived from a chance chestnut seedling found in Toyono in 1750.

References

External links

 Toyono official website 
Nose Railway, Life along the railways

Towns in Osaka Prefecture